The Honourable Edward Hale, D.C.L.  (December 6, 1800 – April 26, 1875) was a Quebec businessman and political figure. Chancellor of Bishop's University and significant figure to Bishop's College School.

Family and early life 

Hale was born in Quebec City in 1800, the son of John Hale, a British army officer who had settled in Lower Canada.  His mother, Elizabeth Amherst Hale, was the sister of Lord William Pitt Amherst. Hale was educated in England and returned to Lower Canada in 1820, where he was named secretary to the auditor general for the province. From 1823 to 1828, he was secretary to his uncle, Lord Amherst, in India. After he returned to Lower Canada, he married Eliza Cecilia, the daughter of Edward Bowen, in 1831.

His brother Jeffery Hale, was a philanthropist at Quebec City. His uncle, also named Edward Hale, was seigneur of Portneuf.

Business career 

Hale settled on a property on the Saint-François River in the Eastern Townships around 1834. He was a shareholder in the British American Land Company which was established to sell land in that part of the province.

Hale was also president of the Stanstead and Sherbrooke Mutual Fire Insurance Company. He was part of the committee that set up the St Lawrence and Atlantic Railway. In 1866, he was named chancellor for Bishop's College and a founder of Bishop's College School.

Political career 

Hale served as secretary to the colonel of the local militia during the Lower Canada Rebellion. In September 1839, he was named to the Special Council which administered the province following the rebellion. He supported the resolutions passed in the council for the union of Upper and Lower Canada. His uncle Edward Hale was also a member of the Special Council at the same time.

In 1840, he was named warden for Sherbrooke district.

After the union, he was elected to the Legislative Assembly of the Province of Canada for Sherbrooke.  He was reelected in 1844, but did not stand for election in the 1848 election.

After Confederation, Hale was named to the Legislative Council of Quebec for Wellington division and served until his death at Quebec City in 1875.

External links
 
 

1800 births
1875 deaths
Politicians from Quebec City
Bishop's College School Faculty
Anglophone Quebec people
Members of the Special Council of Lower Canada
Members of the Legislative Assembly of the Province of Canada from Canada East
Conservative Party of Quebec MLCs
Canadian people of English descent